Christina Pribićević-Zorić is an American translator. She was born in New York to a Yugoslav father and an Irish mother. She has translated more than thirty books from Serbo-Croat and French into English. Some of her major translations include:

 The Dictionary of the Khazars by Milorad Pavić
 Landscape Painted with Tea by Milorad Pavić
 Zlata’s Diary by Zlata Filipović 
 Tales of Old Sarajevo by Isak Samokovlija 
 Frida’s Bed by Slavenka Drakulić 
 Herbarium of Souls by Vladimir Tasic
 The House of Remembering and Forgetting by Filip David

References

Living people
Year of birth missing (living people)
American translators